Raghopur or Raghopur-Supaul (Supaul Dist) Vidhan Sabha constituency was an assembly constituency in Supaul district in the Indian state of Bihar.

As a consequence of the orders of the Delimitation Commission of India, this seat ceased to exist in 2010. But Bihar continues have another constituency by the same name.

Members of Vidhan Sabha

Election Results

1967 Vidhan Sabha
 A. Goit (SSP) : 21,967 votes   
 B.P. Mehta (INC) : 17,918

1977-2004
In the October 2005 and February 2005 state assembly elections, Niraj Kumar Singh Bablu of Janata Dal (United) won the Raghopur assembly seat defeating his nearest rivals Jai Vardhan Yadav of Congress and Md. Zeayuddin of Bahujan Samaj Party, respectively. Contests in most years were multi cornered but only winners and runners are being mentioned. Uday Prakash Goit of Rashtriya Janata Dal defeated Lakhan Thakur of JD(U) in 2000. Lakhan Thakur of Janata Dal defeated Amarendra Mishra of Congress in 1995. Amarendra Mishra of Congress defeated Udai Prakash Goit of Janata Dal  in 1990, Aseshwar Goit of Lok Dal in 1985 and Kumar Sashindra Singh, Independent, in 1980. Asehswar Goit of Janata Party defeated Amarendra Mishra of Congress in 1977.

Feb-2005 Vidhan Sabha
 Niraj Kumar Singh 'Bablu' (JD-U) : 27,601 votes   
 Zeyauddin (BSP)

Oct-2005 Vidhan Sabha
 Niraj Kumar Singh 'Bablu' (JD-U) : 45,079 votes   
 Jai Vardhan Yadav (INC) : 25,691
 Zeyauddin (BSP)

References

Former assembly constituencies of Bihar
Politics of Supaul district